T-Rex was a Ukrainian main battle tank announced in 2016.

Development
It was named after Tyrannosaurus rex. Its main competitor was the Russian MBT T-14 Armata. Sergei Stepanov, the chief designer for Arey, claimed that the tank would have a "conceptually new system of fire control and a high level of personnel protection," along with "many features include high maneuverability, 360-degree vision, and a high-bandwidth counteraction analytics system."

The vehicle would be based on the T-64 and hulls of T-64 and T-72, inherited by the thousands from the Soviet Union, would be reused in the production of the tanks. The Azov Battalion estimated that up to 20 tanks could be upgraded every month.

In 2020, Russian media claimed that development and production of the tank had ceased as the project was "technically unviable." These unverified reports cited stability problems and possible rupturing of the tank barrel when firing 125-mm shells.

Design
The tank would be based on the T-64 and would feature an unmanned turret. The three crew members would be seated in an armored capsule at the front of the hull, where they could remotely-control the cannon, the automatic loader and the machine guns T-Rex would weigh 39 tons and be equipped with a 125mm main gun with "high-power projetiles". The armor would utilize both Nizh and Duplet explosive reactive armor. The combat capability was said by the Ukrainian press to be exceeding those of the Ukrainian Oplot and Bulat, while at the same time being more cost-effective than the Bulat.

References

External links
 Patent for T-Rex (in Ukrainian)

Tanks with autoloaders
Main battle tanks of Ukraine